David Paetkau is a Canadian actor who has played Evan Lewis in Final Destination 2 (2003), the customs officer in LAX (2004), Beck McKaye in Whistler (2006–2008), Ira Glatt in Goon (2011), and Sam Braddock in the CTV/CBS television series Flashpoint (2008–2012).

Paetkau has appeared in Aliens vs. Predator: Requiem, I'll Always Know What You Did Last Summer, So Weird (as Brent on the episode "Vampire"; May 20, 2000), For Heaven's Sake, and a one episode appearance on Dexter, as Lumen's fiancé, Owen. Paetkau has also lent his voice to Canadian commercials for Chevrolet automobiles.

Personal life
Paetkau is one of five children. A native of Vancouver, he is an avid supporter of his hometown NHL team, the Vancouver Canucks.

He is married to Evangeline Duy.

Filmography

Film

Television

Video games

Awards and nominations

References

External links

Male actors from Vancouver
Canadian male film actors
Canadian male television actors
Canadian male voice actors
Living people
20th-century Canadian male actors
21st-century Canadian male actors
Year of birth missing (living people)
Canadian people of Belarusian descent